Marinobacter mobilis is a Gram-negative, halophilic, aerobic and motile bacterium from the genus of Marinobacter which has been isolated from sediments from the East China Sea.

References

External links
Type strain of Marinobacter mobilis at BacDive -  the Bacterial Diversity Metadatabase

Alteromonadales
Bacteria described in 2008
Halophiles